The Emergency Petroleum Allocation Act of 1973 (EPAA) was a U.S. law that required the President to promulgate regulations to allocate and control price of petroleum products in response to the 1973 oil crisis.

It was extended by the Energy Policy and Conservation Act of 1975.

In 1973 and again in 1979 the US Government took control of private stocks of oil under this law. (Jaffe & Soligo, "The role of inventories in oil market stability", Quarterly Review of Economics and Finance 42. 2002. )

1973 in law
93rd United States Congress
United States federal energy legislation
Petroleum politics